Spindale is a town in Rutherford County, North Carolina, United States. The population was 4,321 at the 2010 census.

History

Spindale originated as a mill town from its first textile mill, Spencer Mills, in 1916, until its last textile mill, Stonecutter Mills, organized by J. B. Tanner in 1920, which closed in 1999. The town of Spindale was incorporated on August 21, 1923.  In 1939, the North Carolina General Assembly passed a local act that extended the corporate limits of the town of Spindale, which nearly doubled its size in area.

In 1926, the iconic Spindale House was opened as a community and recreation center and as a memorial building, presented to the town by K. S. Tanner and other members of the Tanner family.  

Opening in 1926, a classic landmark of the Spindale mill village was Greene’s Grocery Store located on Spindale Street, which stood for over five decades as the number one volume store for many mill families, featuring a home delivery truck service, a credit account system, and a fresh meat market.  

The first organized churches in Spindale were First Baptist in 1917, Methodist in 1919, Presbyterian in 1922, and Spencer Baptist in 1926.   

In 1930, the Carolina Theater opened on Main Street in Spindale, which could seat 360 patrons and operated until it closed in 1961. 

The Spindale Sun newspaper was established in 1941.

Geography
Spindale is located along U.S. Route 221A between Forest City to the southeast and Rutherfordton to the west.  U.S. Route 74A passes through the southern part of town.

Demographics

2020 census

As of the 2020 United States census, there were 4,225 people, 1,564 households, and 938 families residing in the town.

2000 census
At the 2000 census there were 4,022 people, 1,662 households, and 1,065 families in the town. The population density was 726.8 people per square mile (280.8/km2). There were 1,887 housing units at an average density of 341.0 per square mile (131.7/km2).  The racial makeup of the town was 72.8% White, 24.9% African American, 0.5% Native American, 0.6% Asian, 0.5% from other races, and 0.8% from two or more races. Hispanic or Latino of any race were 1.44%.

Of the 1,662 households 25.6% had children under the age of 18 living with them, 43.9% were married couples living together, 14.7% had a female householder with no husband present, and 35.9% were non-families. 33.3% of households were one person and 15.2% were one person aged 65 or older. The average household size was 2.29 and the average family size was 2.87.

The age distribution was 22.2% under the age of 18, 8.2% from 18 to 24, 29.5% from 25 to 44, 22.5% from 45 to 64, and 17.6% 65 or older. The median age was 38 years. For every 100 females, there were 97.7 males. For every 100 females age 18 and over, there were 97.0 males.

The median household income was $23,365 and the median family income  was $33,583. Males had a median income of $25,504 versus $20,395 for females. The per capita income for the town was $13,789. About 12.5% of families and 16.5% of the population were below the poverty line, including 21.0% of those under age 18 and 15.9% of those age 65 or over.

Education
Spindale is home to Isothermal Community College, a two-year community college, named for its location in the thermal belt, and a part of the North Carolina Community College system.

Media
WNCW, a noncommercial radio station affiliated with NPR, broadcasts from Isothermal Community College on a frequency of 88.7mhz.  WNCW's programming consists of a diverse blend of musical styles.  Its eclectic music mix and presence on the World Wide Web attracts listeners well beyond the reach of its coverage area.

Notable person
 Bobby F. England, member of the North Carolina General Assembly

See also
 Word of Faith Fellowship

References

External links

 Official site

Towns in Rutherford County, North Carolina
Towns in North Carolina